Byre is a Spanish Youtuber who uploads videos about sneakers and fashion. In addition to uploading videos to YouTube he also creates content on other social networks such as Instagram, Twitter, Twitch or TikTok.

Biography 
Oliver was born on December 29, 1998. He started his YouTube channel on September 16, 2013 and at the end of 2019 he launched a clothing brand called classified.

Career

YouTube Channel 
Byre started on YouTube by uploading videos of games like Call of Duty or Clash Royale, with which he surpassed 100,000 subscribers. After a one-year hiatus due to studies and work he changed the content of his channel and is what has led him to the more than 550,000 subscribers he has now.  
The most outstanding series of his channel are the batallas de outfits, which the Spanish press has echoed on several occasions.

Social media 
In addition to YouTube, Byre creates content on other social networks such as Twitch, Instagram, Twitter or TikTok. In which, as in his channel, he revolves around the topic of sneakers and fashion.

References

External links 
 Byre's website

Spanish YouTubers
Spanish-language YouTubers
Living people
20th-century Spanish people
YouTube vloggers
Twitch (service) streamers
1998 births
Fashion YouTubers
YouTube channels